Gerhard Wehmeier (1935–2009) was an Old Testament Scholar hailing from Germany from the Evangelical Church of Hesse Electorate-Waldeck.  Wehmeier taught Old Testament at the United Theological College, Bangalore from 1973 through 1978.

Studies
Wehmeier studied at the seminary in Bielefeld-Bethel and later at the Universities in Göttingen, Basel, Bonn and Atlanta in North America.

Writings
 1970, Der Segen im Alten Testament: eine semasiologische Untersuchung der Wurzel brk,
1974, The Theme Blessing for the Nations in the Promises to the Patriarchs and in the Prophetical Literature,
1977, The Prohibition of Theft in the Decalogue,

Teaching
Wehmeier began teaching Old Testament at the United Theological College, Bangalore from 1973 during the Principalship of J. R. Chandran.  Wehmeier's students who specialized in Old Testament during that period include,
1972-1974, S. J. Theodore of the Church of South India, Diocese of Karimnagar,
1972-1975, Nitoy Achümi of the Bible Society of India,
1975-1977, R. Daniel Premkumar of the Church of South India Synod,
1976-1978, D. Dhanaraj of the Karnataka Theological College,
1977-1979, J. Bhaskar Jeyaraj of the South Asia Institute of Advanced Christian Studies.

When Wehmeier joined the seminary in 1973, John Sadananda, the present Master of the Senate of Serampore College (University) was still a graduate student who benefited from the Old Testament scholarship of Wehmeier and his other two colleagues, G. M. Butterworth and E. C. John and the three of them led the Old Testament studies in Bangalore while John D. W. Watts and G. Babu Rao led the Old Testament studies in Serampore College, Serampore for nearly half a decade.

After Wehmeier returned to Germany in 1978 to take up responsibilities with his home Church, the Evangelical Church of Hesse Electorate-Waldeck, he continued to be involved in matters relating to ministerial support for students pursuing seminary studies in India.  It was Wehmeier who made possible the overseas research studies of Daniel Sadananda, a New Testament Scholar and current President of the United Theological College, Bangalore Society.

Reminisce
Bishop :de:Martin Hein, EKD,

References

1935 births
2009 deaths
20th-century Christian clergy
Academic staff of the Senate of Serampore College (University)
Old Testament scholars